Lebanese International University is a university located in Nouakchott, Mauritania. It is part of the private Lebanese International University group.

External links

References

Universities in Mauritania
Nouakchott